Piz Ravetsch is a mountain in the Lepontine Alps, located in Graubünden near the border with Ticino. Piz Ravetsch is the highest summit of the range that separates Val Maighels and the valley of Lake Curnera. A relatively large glacier, named Glatscher da Maighels lies over its western flanks.

References

External links
Piz Ravetsch on Summitpost

Mountains of Graubünden
Mountains of the Alps
Alpine three-thousanders
Lepontine Alps
Mountains of Switzerland
Tujetsch